Malford Milligan (born March 29, 1959) is an American singer. He sings soul, blues and gospel songs and also writes music. He has won 8 Austin Music Awards for Best Vocalist.

Career

Storyville
In 1994 Milligan became the singer for Storyville until they broke up in 2000. Milligan became a session singer and recorded vocals for many musicians such as: Eric Johnson and Chris Smither. Storyville never managed to become a national act.

Solo
Between 2002 and 2006 he recorded several albums with his own band, The Malford Milligan Band and provided vocals for Greg Koch led bands.

2017-2019

In 2017 Milligan began singing with The Southern Aces band.

2019-2020

On tour in the Netherlands with the Blues and Americana Tour of Johan Derksen in about 80 Concerthalls and Theaters (all sold out). Concerts have been postponed due to COVID-19 restrictions since March 2020.

Awards
The Austin Chronicle named Milligan the "Best Male Vocalist of the Decade" in 2000.
Austin Music Awards Best Vocalist 8 Times

Discography with Storyville
 Bluest Eyes (1993)
 A Piece of Your Soul (1995)
 Dog Years (1998)
 Live at Antone's (2006)

Discography of other projects
 Alive And More (Funky London) (2000)
 The Gospel According to Austin, Vol. 2 (2001)
 Sweet Cherry Soul (2002)
 No Good Deed Goes Unpunished (2004)
 The Malford Milligan Band Rides Again (2006)
 Live on the Radio (Greg Koch and Other Bad Men) (2007)
 Nation Sack (Greg Koch and Malford Milligan) (2009)
 An Evening with the Songs of Stephen Bruton (2010)
 The Milligan Vaughan Project (2017)
 Life Will Humble You (Malford Milligan & The Southern Aces) (2018)
 I Was a Witness (Malford Milligan & The Southern Aces) (2021)

Education
Elgin High School in 1978
Texas Tech University
University of Texas at Austin (Sociology major dropped out 1981)

Personal
Milligan was raised in Elgin and Lubbock, Texas. His family worked on cotton farms in Central Texas to the south plains. Milligan was born a black albino. He is now almost blind. Milligan got married in January 2019.

See also
Music of Austin, Texas

References

External links
 November 2004 review: Rockin Texas Blues. Best blues soul singer in Texas. 'Nuff said.
Elblogdearchi.com
April 1997 Texas Monthly feature: "Milligan's Island"

1959 births
Living people
American soul singers
American blues singers
People with albinism
People from Taylor, Texas